Hiles may refer to the following locations in the United States:

 Hiles, Wood County, Wisconsin, a town
 Hiles (community), Wisconsin, an unincorporated community
 Hiles, Forest County, Wisconsin, a town

People with the surname
 Barbara Hiles (1891–1984), artist
 Darrell Hiles (born 1969), Australian boxer
 Dianne Hiles (born 20th century), Australian accountant and human rights activist
 George Hiles (1825–1896), American businessman
 Henry Hiles (1826–1904), English composer
 Osia Joslyn Hiles (born 1832), American philanthropist and poet 
 Paul Hiles (born 1948), Bermudian sailor
 Van Hiles (born 1975), American football player